Alyas Batman at Robin is an unauthorized 1965 Filipino Batman comedy-adventure film produced by  D'lanor Productions.

It stars famous Philippine actors such as Bob Soler, famous for his turn as Captain Barbell and The Phantom in other Filipino films, as Batman, Lou Salvador Jr., as Robin and actress Nova Villa.

Plot

Cast
 Bob Soler as Batman
 Lou Salvador Jr. as Robin
 Nova Villa
 Marion Douglas
 Oscar Keesee
 Nello Nayo
 Pablo Virtuoso
 Joe Garcia
 Mary Walter
 Angel Buenaventura
 Vic Uematsu
 Diego Guerrero

See also
 Alyas Batman en Robin
 James Batman
 Captain Philippines at Boy Pinoy

References

External links

Alyas Batman At Robin (1965)

1965 films
1965 independent films
1960s adventure comedy films
1960s superhero films
Unofficial Batman films
Philippine adventure comedy films
Tagalog-language films
Robin (character) films
1965 comedy films